FRCP may refer to:
 Federal Rules of Civil Procedure
 Federal Rules of Criminal Procedure
 Fellow of the Royal College of Physicians